"This Is Music" is a song by the English alternative rock band The Verve. It was
released as the first single from their second album, A Northern Soul. The aptly named song is full of varied lyrical images. The song charted at #35 in the United Kingdom. "This Is Music" featured as the band's opening song for the majority of their 2008 reunion tour.
The cover was shot in Leeds, England by Michael Spencer Jones.

Music video 
The video depicts the band playing inside of a black room. Ashcroft as well as a young woman are shown standing in front of a building identified as Balfron Tower and walking inside it. The video ends with Ashcroft falling from the aforementioned building.

Reception 
AllMusic writer Jason Aneky considered the song to be a highlight on the album.

Track listing 

 CD HUTCD 54
This Is Music – 3.35
Let the Damage Begin – 4.23
You and Me – 3.53
 7" HUT 54
This Is Music – 3.35
Let the Damage Begin – 4.23
 12" HUTT 54
This Is Music – 3.35
Let the Damage Begin – 4.23
You and Me – 3.53

US version 
In 1995 This Is Music was released for the American market – with a different track listing. The single was distributed by American label Vernon Yard Recordings.
 CD Promo DPRO-11041
This Is Music – 3.35
History (Radio Edit) – 4.02
On Your Own (Solo Acoustic/Recorded Live from MTV's 120 Minutes) – 4.01

References

External links 
"This is Music" Music video

The Verve songs
1995 singles
Hut Records singles
1995 songs
Songs written by Nick McCabe
Songs written by Richard Ashcroft
Songs written by Simon Jones (musician)
Songs written by Peter Salisbury